The Venerable Christopher Gregorie  was an Anglican priest in the late 16th century.

Gregorie was born in Warwickshire and educated at Magdalen College, Oxford. He was incorporated at Cambridge in 1579. Gregorie held livings at Cromwell, Kirby Misperton and Scrayingham. Hooke was Archdeacon of York from 1597 until his death in 1600.

Notes 

1600 deaths
Alumni of Magdalen College, Oxford
Archdeacons of York
People from Warwickshire
16th-century English Anglican priests